Masala, Massala or MASALA may refer to:

Spice
 Masala (spice), any of the many spice mixes used in South Asian cuisine
 Masala chai, a flavoured tea beverage
 Masala incense, Indian incense using a spice mix
 Masala dosa, an Indian dish

Places
 Masala, Kirkkonummi, a village in Finland

Arts, entertainment and media

Films
 Masala film, a film style
 Masala (1991 film), a Canadian drama film
 Masala (2012 film), a Marathi film
 Masala (2013 film), a Telugu film

Television
 Masala (TV series), a Singapore-Tamil soap opera
 Hum Masala, a television channel formerly called Masala TV

People
 Masala (surname)

Other uses
 Massachusetts Area South Asian Lambda Association, an LGBT group for people of South Asian ethnicity

See also
 Marsala (disambiguation)
 Massala (disambiguation)